Ya'akov Yechezkiya Greenwald (Hebrew: יעקב יחזקי' גרינוואלד. Legal name: Jakab Grünwald. Also called the "Vayaged Ya'akov", 1882 – c. 1 March 1941 (2 Adar 5701)) was the rabbi of the Etz Chaim community in Pápa, Hungary, and the rosh yeshiva there. He was the predecessor of the Pupa Hasidic dynasty.

Early life 
Greenwald was born in Csorna to Moshe Grunwald, rabbi and rosh yeshiva of Khust,  and studied under his father until his marriage in 1900 to his cousin Sara Rivkah Brown.

Career 
In 1906 Greenwald was appointed rabbi of Likov. In 1912 he was appointed rabbi of Deutschkreutz, replacing his uncle Eliezer David Greenwald. In 1924 he became rabbi of Hunyad and headed a yeshiva in the city.

In 1929, he became rabbi of Pápa, Hungary. He established a yeshiva there which soon numbered 300 students, and became one of the largest and most important Hungarian yeshivas.

Greenwald was a Belz hasid and sent many of his disciples to Belz.

Death and succession 
Greenwald died in 1941 and was buried in the Jewish cemetery in Pápa, where he was succeeded by his son, Yosef Greenwald, as Rabbi of the Etz Chaim community in Pápa and as rosh yeshiva.

His successors as rebbe include his son Yosef Greenwald and Yosef's son Ya'akov Yehezkiya Greenwald II.

Students 

 Yaakov Yitzchak Neumann, rabbi of the Belz community in Montreal

 Shlomo Lorincz, member of the Knesset on behalf of Agudat Yisrael

External links
 Manuscript – Speech for the Blowing of the Shofar from the Holy Admor R’ Yaakov Yechezkiya Greenwald Aba”d Zelem and Papa

References 

Greenwald family
Hungarian Hasidic rabbis
People from Pápa
1882 births
1941 deaths